The Regent Hong Kong is five-star hotel located at 18 Salisbury Road, Kowloon, Hong Kong. The hotel is on the harbour, offering views of Victoria Harbour and is close to various tourist attractions. The hotel has 497 rooms and 85 suites and is considered to be the flagship property of the group.

History
The hotel opened in 1980, as The Regent Hong Kong, owned by New World Development and managed by Regent International Hotels. It was built as the flagship property of RIH, founded by hotelier Robert H. Burns and Japan’s Tokyu Hotels Group in 1970. In 1992, Regent Hotels was acquired by Four Seasons Hotels. 

On May 21, 2001, New World sold the hotel to Bass Hotels and Resorts for US$346 million and it was rebranded as the InterContinental Hong Kong on June 1, 2001. Four Seasons Hotels, which owned Regent Hotels at the time, controlled 25% of the property's management contract, causing them to enter rent arbitration with New World, which was resolved in August 2001, when New World agreed to pay Four Seasons an unspecified amount.

In July 2015, InterContinental Hotels Group (IHG), the successor company to Bass Hotels and Resorts, agreed to sell InterContinental Hong Kong to Supreme Key, a consortium of investors, for US$938 million. It was reported that IHG will retain a 37-year management contract, with three 10-year extension rights.

In March 2018, it was announced that the hotel would close for renovations in 2020 before reopening in 2021. Subject to InterContinental Hotels' majority-stake acquisition of Regent Hotels, the hotel will reopen as a Regent once again in early 2023. InterContinental Hong Kong officially ceased operations on April 20, 2020, in order to commence the two-year renovation and conversion program to Regent Hong Kong.

Facilities
The hotel has 497 rooms including 85 suites, designed by the architect Chi Wing lo. Majority of the rooms and suites offer views of the Victoria Harbour. 

Guestrooms and Suites open for stays from March 2023, best booked online via the hotel’s website https://www.Hongkong.regenthotels.com/

Restaurants & Bars
The hotel has 6 restaurants and bar including the 2-MICHELIN Star Lai Ching Heen (Cantonese cuisine, previously named Yan Toh Heen), Harbourside (all-day dining with buffets), the Steakhouse (for meat and wine lovers), Nobu opening July 2023(Japanese cuisine by celebrity chef Nobu Matsuhisa) and Lobby Lounge (for drinks, afternoon tea, and a all-day menu), they will later introduce a new Bar concept expected to be launched by September 2023 named Qura.

On December 26, 2022 the Regent Hong Kong opened its doors with the soft opening of three of its Restaurants, part of the new Dining Destination, introducing: The Steak House, Lobby Lounge and Harbourside.

Harbourside, The Steakhouse and the new Bar have been designed by Bar Studio in Australia https://www.barstudio.com/

Yan Toh Heen officially rebranded and returned to its original name “Lai Ching Heen” , the name of the restaurant when it was previously the Regent Hong Kong.

SPA
A new spa will be introduced, designed by P49DEESIGN from Thailand https://www.p49deesign.com/ together with Raison d’Etre Spas, and offers a fully equipped fitness/gym as well as an outdoor swimming pool overlooking the Victoria Harbour.

Meetings & Events
The hotel also serves as a venue for wedding and gala nights. Its pillarless ballroom can accommodate up to 1000 guests. The hotel has 18,719 square feet (1,779 Square meters) of event/meeting space, along with eleven function/meeting rooms and Hong Kong's largest hotel with LED walls for presentations and hybrid events.

In popular culture
The hotel has a long and distinguished history, having received many notable guests and being featured in various films, television shows, and travel programmes. The notable guests who stayed at the hotel include the prince and princess from Britain, US presidents including Jimmy Carter, Richard Nixon, Gerald Ford, and George Bush, and celebrities such as Frank Sinatra, Elizabeth Taylor, Catherine Deneuve, Sidney Poitier, Roger Moore, Robert DeNiro, Charles Bronson, Julio Iglesias, Tom Jones, Bo Derek, Meg Ryan, Barbara Walters, Calvin Klein, Angelina Jolie and Brad Pitt.

The hotel has also been featured in various film scenes including the TV miniseries Noble House (1988) and TV movie Nightwatch (1995), both with Pierce Brosnan and US TV series Dynasty (1985). A list of television programmes filmed at the hotel includes Danish TV series Borgen (2012) and NBC’s Better Late Than Never (2016), while the feature film Lost in Hong Kong (2015) with Xu Zhen shot scenes in the hotel’s Presidential Suite.

The hotel has also been featured in various international travel programmes including EXTRA Mansions & Millionaires with Michael Corbett (2015) and CNBC’s First Class with Emily Tan (2017). Various live news programmes have also been reported from the hotel including NBC / CNBC News with Tom Brokaw and Peter Greenberg in 1997. CNN has also reported live from the hotel numerous times, including the Handover; turn of the Millennium (New Year’s Eve 1999), and the 20th anniversary of the Handover (July 1, 2017). 

The hotel has also been a location for shooting popular music videos including Japanese pop icon Ayumi’s “Distance Love” music video in 2007 and Jay Chou’s “Give Me the Time for One Song (Gei Wo Yi Shou Ge De Shi Jian)” in 2008).

Awards
 Ranked as one of the “World’s Best” hotels by international publications including Institutional Investor, Business Traveler, Conde Nast Traveler and Travel & Leisure.
 First IHG property to receive 5 stars for eight consecutive years by Forbes Travel Guide.
 First hotel in Hong Kong to receive EarthCheck Platinum Certification.
 Hotel’s NOBU restaurant listed at no.15 on Asia's Top 20 Restaurants of the Miele Guide in the 2009/2010 edition
 The Presidential Suite, listed at number 15 on World's 15 most expensive hotel suites compiled by CNN Travel in 2012.

References

External links 

Regent Hong Kong official website

Hotels in Hong Kong
Tsim Sha Tsui
InterContinental hotels
Buildings and structures completed in 1980